In chemistry, quaternary ammonium cations, also known as quats, are positively-charged polyatomic ions of the structure , R being an alkyl group or an aryl group. Unlike the ammonium ion and the primary, secondary, or tertiary ammonium cations, the quaternary ammonium cations are permanently charged, independent of the pH of their solution. Quaternary ammonium salts or quaternary ammonium compounds (called quaternary amines in oilfield parlance) are salts of quaternary ammonium cations. Polyquats are a variety of engineered polymer forms which provide multiple quat molecules within a larger molecule.

Quats are used in consumer applications including as antimicrobials (such as detergents and disinfectants), fabric softeners, and hair conditioners. As an antimicrobial, they are able to inactivate enveloped viruses (such as SARS-CoV-2). Quats tend to be gentler on surfaces than bleach-based disinfectants, and are generally fabric-safe.

Synthesis 
Quaternary ammonium compounds are prepared by the alkylation of tertiary amine.  Industrial production of commodity quat salts usually involves hydrogenation of fatty nitriles, which can generate primary or secondary amines. These amines are then treated with methyl chloride.

The quaternization of alkyl amines by alkyl halides is widely documented. In older literature this is often called a Menshutkin reaction, however modern chemists usually refer to it simply as quaternization. The reaction can be used to produce a compound with unequal alkyl chain lengths; for example when making cationic surfactants one of the alkyl groups on the amine is typically longer than the others. A typical synthesis is for benzalkonium chloride from a long-chain alkyldimethylamine and benzyl chloride:

CH3(CH2)_\mathit{n}N(CH3)2{} + ClCH2C6H5 ->{} [CH3(CH2)_\mathit{n}N(CH3)2CH2C6H5]+Cl-

Reactions
Quaternary ammonium cations are unreactive toward even strong electrophiles, oxidants, and acids. They also are stable toward most nucleophiles. The latter is indicated by the stability of the hydroxide salts such as tetramethylammonium hydroxide and tetrabutylammonium hydroxide even at elevated temperatures. The halflife of Me4NOH in 6M NaOH at 160 °C is >61 h.

Because of their resilience, many unusual anions have been isolated as the quaternary ammonium salts. Examples include tetramethylammonium pentafluoroxenate, containing the highly reactive pentafluoroxenate ion. Permanganate can be solubilized in organic solvents, when deployed as its  salt.

With exceptionally strong bases, quat cations degrade. They undergo Sommelet–Hauser rearrangement and Stevens rearrangement, as well as dealkylation under harsh conditions or in presence of strong nucleophiles, like thiolates. Quaternary ammonium cations containing N−C−C−H units can also undergo the Hofmann elimination and Emde degradation.

Examples
 Tetramethylammonium ion: , also denoted  (Me = methyl group)
 Tetraethylammonium ion: , also denoted  (Et = ethyl group)
 Tetrapropylammonium ion: , also denoted  (Pr = propyl group)
 Tetrabutylammonium ion: , also denoted  (Bu = butyl group)

Applications
Quaternary ammonium salts are used as disinfectants, surfactants, fabric softeners, and as antistatic agents (e.g. in shampoos). In liquid fabric softeners, the chloride salts are often used. In dryer anticling strips, the sulfate salts are often used. Older aluminium electrolytic capacitors and spermicidal jellies also contain quaternary ammonium salts. Quats are also used in contraception formulations, veterinary products, diagnostic testing, vaccine production, and nasal formulations. 

Some scientists have raised concerns about the level of understanding of safety profile of quat disinfectants on people. As of August 2020, half of disinfectants the United States Environmental Protection Agency suggested as effective against COVID-19 contained one of the quats, and often a quat as the sole ingredient. Salmonella and E. coli O157:H7 exposed to quats have developed cross resistance to antibiotics. A subject of concern is the potential effect of increased use of quats related to COVID-19 pandemic on antibiotic resistance in a larger microbial community in nature and engineered environment.

Medicines

Quaternary ammonium compounds have antimicrobial activity. Quaternary ammonium compounds, especially those containing long alkyl chains, are used as antimicrobials and disinfectants. Examples are benzalkonium chloride, benzethonium chloride, methylbenzethonium chloride, cetalkonium chloride, cetylpyridinium chloride, cetrimonium, cetrimide, dofanium chloride, tetraethylammonium bromide, didecyldimethylammonium chloride and domiphen bromide. Also good against fungi, amoebas, and enveloped viruses (such as SARS-CoV-2), most quaternary ammonium compounds are believed to act by disrupting the cell membrane or viral envelope. (Some QACs, such as dequalinium and similar bis-QACs, show evidence of a different mode of action.)

Quaternary ammonium compounds are lethal to a wide variety of organisms except endospores and non-enveloped viruses, both having no accessible membrane coat to attack. It is possible to solve the endospore problem by adding chemicals which force them to germinate. They have reduced efficacy against gram-negative bacteria, mycobacteria, and bacteria in biofilms due to them having additional layers that need to be penetrated or disrupted. Some bacteria such as MRSA have acquired resistance genes, qacA/B and qacC/D, that pump the cation out of the cell.

Phase transfer catalysts
In organic chemistry, quaternary ammonium salts are employed as phase transfer catalysts (PTCs). Such catalysts accelerate reactions between reagents dissolved in immiscible solvents. The highly reactive reagent dichlorocarbene is generated via PTC by reaction of chloroform and aqueous sodium hydroxide.

Fabric softeners and hair conditioners
In the 1950s, distearyldimethylammonium chloride (DHTDMAC), was introduced as a fabric softener. This compound was discontinued because the cation biodegrades too slowly. Contemporary fabric softeners are based on salts of quaternary ammonium cations where the fatty acid is linked to the quaternary center via ester linkages; these are commonly referred to as betaine-esters or ester-quats and are susceptible to degradation, e.g., by hydrolysis. Characteristically, the cations contain one or two long alkyl chains derived from fatty acids linked to an ethoxylated ammonium salt. Other cationic compounds can be derived from imidazolium, guanidinium, substituted amine salts, or quaternary alkoxy ammonium salts.

The antistatic qualities that make quaternary ammonium salts useful as fabric softeners also make them useful in hair conditioners and shampoos. The idea was pioneered by Henkel with a 1984 patent. Examples include cetrimonium chloride and behentrimonium chloride.

Plant growth retardants
Cycocel (chlormequat chloride) reduces plant height by inhibiting the production of gibberellins, the primary plant hormones responsible for cell elongation. Therefore, their effects are primarily on stem, petiole and flower stalk tissues. Lesser effects are seen in reductions of leaf expansion, resulting in thicker leaves with darker green color.

Natural occurrence
Several quanternary ammonium derivatives exist in nature.  Prominent examples include  glycine betaine, choline, carnitine. butyrobetaine, homarine, and trigonelline. Glycine betaine, an osmolyte, stabilizes osmotic pressure in cells.

 

Choline is a precursor for the neurotransmitter acetylcholine. Choline is also a constituent of lecithin, which is present in many plants and animal organs.  It is found in phospholipids. For example, phosphatidylcholines, a major component of biological membranes, are a member of the lecithin group of fatty substances in animal and plant tissues.

Carnitine participates in the beta-oxidation of fatty acids.

Health effects 
Quaternary ammonium compounds can display a range of health effects, amongst which are mild skin and respiratory irritation  up to severe caustic burns on skin and the gastrointestinal wall (depending on concentration), gastrointestinal symptoms (e.g., nausea and vomiting), coma, convulsions, hypotension and death.

They are thought to be the chemical group responsible for anaphylactic reactions that occur with use of neuromuscular blocking drugs during general anaesthesia in surgery. Quaternium-15 is the single most often found cause of allergic contact dermatitis of the hands (16.5% in 959 cases).

Possible reproductive effects in laboratory animals
Quaternary ammonium-based disinfectants (Virex and Quatricide) were tentatively identified as the most probable cause of jumps in birth defects and fertility problems in caged lab mice. The quat ingredients in the disinfectants include alkyl dimethyl benzyl ammonium chloride (ADBAC) and didecyl dimethyl ammonium chloride (DDAC). A similar link was tentatively identified in nurses. The studies contradict earlier toxicology data reviewed by the U.S. Environmental Protection Agency (U.S. EPA) and the EU Commission.

Quantification
The quantification of quaternary ammonium compounds can be challenging.  Some methods include precipitation of solid salts with tetraphenylborate. Another method, an Epton titration, involves partitioning between water-chloroform in the presence of an anionic dye.  Individual cations are detectable by ESI-MS and NMR spectroscopy.

See also 
 Ammonium
 Benzyltrimethylammonium fluoride
 Iminium

References

Further reading

External links 
 

 
Disinfectants
Food safety

de:Quats